The League of Ireland Player of the Month is awarded monthly to the best player in the League of Ireland. The winners are selected by Soccer Writers' Ireland, commonly known as the SWI (formerly known as Soccer Writers' Association of Ireland).

Winners

1971–72

1972–73

1973–74

1974–75

1975–76

1976–77

1977–78

1978–79

1979–80

1980–81

1981–82

1982–83

1983–84

1984–85

1985–86

1986–87

1987–88

1988–89

1989–90

1990–91

1991–92

1992–93

1993–94

1994–95

1995–96

1996–97

1997–98

1998–99

1999–00

2000–01

2001–02

2002–03

2003

2004

2005

2006

2007

2008

2009

2010

2011

2012

2013

2014

2015

2016

2017

2018

2019

2020

2021

2022

Multiple winners
The below table lists those who have won on more than one occasion.

Awards won by position 
As of 7 December 2022

Awards won by nationality
As of 7 December 2022

Awards won by club 
As of 7 December 2022

External links 
 

League of Ireland Premier Division
League of Ireland trophies and awards
Republic of Ireland association football trophies and awards